United Nations Security Council Resolution 352, adopted on June 21, 1974, after examining the application of Grenada for membership in the United Nations, the Council recommended to the General Assembly that Grenada be admitted.

See also
 List of United Nations Security Council Resolutions 301 to 400 (1971–1976)

References
Text of the Resolution at undocs.org

External links
 

 0352
 0352
 0352
1974 in Grenada
June 1974 events